Wenceslaus II of Cieszyn (1488/96 – 17 November 1524) was a Duke of Cieszyn from 1518 until his death (as co-ruler of his father).

He was the second son of Casimir II, Duke of Cieszyn, by his wife Johanna  Poděbrady, daughter of Victor, Duke of Münsterberg and Duke of Opawa.

Life
The decision of Casimir II to destine his eldest son Frederick to the Church career placed Wenceslaus as the presumed successor of his father. Frederick's death in 1507 led Wenceslaus II as the sole heir of Casimir II, but it wasn't until 1518 that he was named co-ruler of the Duchy of Cieszyn. However, he died four years before his father, so Wenceslaus II never ruled alone. After Casimir II's death in 1528 he was succeeded by his grandson Wenceslaus III Adam, the only surviving son of Wenceslaus II.

Marriage and issue
On 1 December 1518, Wenceslaus II married Anna (b. 5 May 1487 - d. 7 February 1539), daughter of Frederick I, Margrave of Brandenburg-Ansbach. They had three children:
A son (b. by 31 May 1520 - d. 1520/bef. 1 September 1525?).
Ludmila (b. ca. 1523 - d. aft. March/7 April 1539).
Wenceslaus III Adam (b. posthumously, December 1524 - d. 4 November 1579).

Ancestry

References

Chronological Dates in Stoyan
Genealogy of the Dukes of Cieszyn

1490s births
1524 deaths
Piast dynasty